George B. Sutherland is an artist and teacher in Stamford, Connecticut. He specializes in watercolor and oils.
He has work in both the impressionist and classical schools.

His teacher was George Passantino (1922–2004). Sutherland has had exhibits in the New York Jacob Javits Center and the World Trade Center.

External links 
GeorgeBSutherland.com

21st-century American painters
21st-century American male artists
Living people
American male painters
Year of birth missing (living people)